The Mutteristock is a mountain in the Schwyzer Alps, which rises 2294 meters above sea level. It is located between the cantons of Glarus and Schwyz, Switzerland, overlooking the Wägitalersee and the Klöntalersee on its northern and southern side respectively. Its summit is the highest point of the subrange lying north of Pragel Pass. The mountain's slopes display bare limestone.

References

External links
Mutteristock on Hikr

Mountains of the Alps
Mountains of Switzerland
Mountains of the canton of Glarus
Mountains of the canton of Schwyz
Glarus–Schwyz border
Two-thousanders of Switzerland